Not Safe for Work is a British comedy-drama series created and written by D. C. Moore, produced by Clerkenwell Films and broadcast by Channel 4. The series, originally called Cut, explores the shattered personal and professional lives of a group of highly dysfunctional civil servants.

Despite being set in Northampton, the show was filmed 340 miles away in Glasgow.

Plot
The series follows civil servant Katherine (Zawe Ashton), who is forced to move from London to a satellite office in Northampton following public sector cuts.

Cast
 Zawe Ashton as Katherine
 Sophie Rundle as Jenny
 Sacha Dhawan as Danny
 Tom Weston-Jones as Anthony
 Sian Brooke as Martine
 Samuel Barnett as Nathanial
 Anastasia Hille as Jeffries
 Jo Hartley as Angela

References

External links
 
 
 
 

2010s British comedy-drama television series
2015 British television series debuts
2015 British television series endings
2010s British television miniseries
Channel 4 comedy
English-language television shows
Television shows set in Northamptonshire
Television series by Clerkenwell Films